Lohithaswa T. S. (5 August 1942 – 8 November 2022) was an Indian Kannada film actor and playwright and an English professor. He acted in more than five hundred Kannada movies, stage plays, and television serials. He was popularly known for his dominating voice in the Kannada film industry. His son is actor Sharath Lohitashwa.

Life and career

Lohithaswa died from a heart attack on 8 November 2022, at the age of 80.

Partial filmography

 Abhimanyu (1990)
 Aapadbandhava (1987)
 A. K. 47 (1999)
 Athiratha Maharatha (1987)
 Avatara Purusha (1988)
 Banda Mukta (1987)
 Bete (1986)
 Bedi (1987)
 C. B. I. Shiva (1991)
 Chaduranga (1988)
 Chandu (2002)
 Chakravarthy (1990)
 Chanakya (1984)
 Chinna (1994)
 Daada (1988)
 December 31 (1986)
 Deva (1987)
 Drama (2012)
 Ellaranthalla Nanna Ganda (1997)
 Ekalavya (1990)
 Emergency (1995)
 Gajendra (1984)
 Galigey
 Geetha (1996)
 Hello Daddy (1988)
 Hosa Neeru (1985)
 Huliya (1996)
 Indina Ramayana (1984)
 Indrajith (1989)
 Jayasimha (1987)
 Kadana (1991)
 Kadina Raja (1985)
 Kaveri Nagara (2013)
 Kalavida (1997)
 Kona Edaithe (1995)
 Lockup Death (1994)
 Marjala (1986)
 Midida Hrudayagalu (1993)
 Mooru Janma (1984)
 Muniyana Madari (1981)
 Mysore Jaana (1992)
 Mr. Raja (1987)
 Navabharatha (1988)
 Nee Bareda Kadambari (1985)
 New Delhi (1988)
 Olavina Aasare (1988)
 Olavu Moodidaga (1984)
 Ondu Oorina Kathe (1978)
 Onthara Bannagalu (2018)
 Police Lockup (1992)
 Pratap (1990)
 Preeti Vathsalya (1984)
 Readymade Ganda (1991)
 Ranachandi (1991)
 Sangliyana (1988)
 S.P. Sangliyana Part-2 (1990)
 Sahasa Veera (1988)
 Samayada Gombe (1984)
 Sambhavami Yuge Yuge (1988)
 Sangrama (1987)
 Saarathi (2011)
 Savyasachi (1995)
 Shanthi Nivasa (1997)
 Shivaraj (1991)
 Simhada Guri (1998)
 Simhasana (1983)
 Snehaloka (1999)
 Sundarakanda (1991)
 Tumbida Mane (1995)'
Time Bomb
 Vishwa (1999)

Television serials

Antim Raja, directed by M.S. Sathyu
Gruhabhanga, directed by Girish Kasaravalli
Malgudi days, directed by Shankar Nag
Natyarani Shantala, directed by G.V. Iyer
Om Namo, directed by K.M. Chaitanya
Prathidhwani, directed by M.S. Sathyu
 "MAANASA VEENA" produced by Chetan Chaman for Zee Kannada 2006-2007 mega serial of the Zee launch

Literary works

Akkadi Saalu - prose collection, released on 21 September 2009
Hottu Hoguva Munna - poetry collection, released on 21 September 2009
Madusikkadalla
A Million Mansions
Mukhyamantri
Sallapa
Santheyalli Nintha Kabeera and Dr Thippeshi - play, released on 21 September 2009
Siddagangeya Siddapurusha

Stage plays

27 Mavalli Circle, directed by T.N. Narasimhan
Belchi
Bharatha Darshana
Chasnala Tragedy
Dhangey Munchina Dinagalu, directed by Prasanna
Huliya Neralu, directed by Prasanna
Huttava Badidarey, directed by Prasanna
Katthaley Daari Doora, directed by T.N. Narasimhan
Kubi Mathhu Iyala, directed by Prasanna
Meravanigey, directed by Gangandharswamy
Mote Raman Sathyagraha, M.S. Sathyu
Panchama, directed by C.G. Krishanswamy

Awards
Karnataka State Nataka Academy Award, 1997
Suvarna Karnataka Rajyotsava Award, 2006

References

External links
 

1942 births
2022 deaths
Male actors in Kannada cinema
Indian male film actors
Indian male stage actors
Indian male television actors
Kannada people
People from Tumkur district
20th-century Indian male actors
21st-century Indian male actors
Male actors in Kannada television
Recipients of the Rajyotsava Award 2006